Pulsar Fusion is a UK-based start-up that has demonstrated two designs of prototype rocket engine. It is headquartered in Bletchley, United Kingdom.

History 
Pulsar Fusion was founded by Richard Dinan in 2011. Pulsar has tested its first Hall effect satellite thruster, achieving an exhaust velocity of 20 m/s.  
Pulsar tested its hybrid polyethylene/nitrous oxide launch rocket engines in November 2021.
On their website, as of end-2022, they claim having a Direct Fusion Drive in development.

References

British companies established in 2019
Aerospace companies of the United Kingdom
Aerospace companies
Companies of the United Kingdom